Perigonia is a genus of moths in the family Sphingidae.

Species
Perigonia caryae Cadiou & Rawlins, 1998
Perigonia divisa Grote, 1865
Perigonia glaucescens Walker, 1856
Perigonia grisea Rothschild & Jordan, 1903
Perigonia ilus Boisduval, 1870
Perigonia jamaicensis Rothschild, 1894
Perigonia lefebvraei (H. Lucas, 1857)
Perigonia leucopus Rothschild & Jordan, 1910
Perigonia lusca (Fabricius, 1777)
Perigonia manni Clark, 1935
Perigonia pallida Rothschild & Jordan, 1903
Perigonia passerina Boisduval, 1875
Perigonia pittieri Lichy, 1962
Perigonia stulta Herrich-Schäffer, 1854
Perigonia thayeri Clark, 1928

 
Dilophonotini
Moth genera
Taxa named by Gottlieb August Wilhelm Herrich-Schäffer